The 2000–01 season of the Regionalliga was the seventh season of the league at tier three (III) of the German football league system.

The Regionalliga was split into two divisions, the Regionalliga Nord and the Regionalliga Süd. The champions of each, 1. FC Union Berlin and Karlsruher SC, were promoted to the 2001–02 2. Bundesliga, along with northern runners-up SV Babelsberg 03 and southern third placed team 1. FC Schweinfurt 05. The southern runners-up, VfB Stuttgart II, was ineligible for promotion.

Regionalliga Nord

Table

Top scorers

Regionalliga Süd

Table

Top scorers

References

External links 
 Regionalliga at the German Football Association 

Regionalliga seasons
3
Germ